Nejapa de Madero is a town and municipality in Oaxaca in south-western Mexico. 
It is part of the Yautepec District in the east of the Sierra Sur Region, not far from the main highway between Oaxaca, Oaxaca and Salina Cruz.
The name "Nejapa" means "ash water".

The municipality covers an area of 370 km2 at an altitude of 660 meters above sea level.
The climate is warm, with rain in summer and autumn.
Tree include pine and oak, and fruits such as papaya, melon, watermelon, tomatoes, peppers, banana, mango, orange, lemon and sapota grow here. 
Wild fauna include deer, coyote, rabbits, costoche, raccoon, badger, opossum, iguana, dove, squirrels, eagles, hawk and vulture.

It was established around 1548 for the Spaniards after have conquered Mexico. One of the  founders and first parish priest of the village was the friar Pedro García, native from Navamorales in Salamanca, Spain.
As of 2005, the municipality had 1,702 households with a total population of 7,285 of whom 1,300 spoke an indigenous language.
Economic activities include cultivation of maize, sorghum, peanuts and other crops such as beans, coffee and various fruits, and animal husbandry.
There is some logging.
Many of the people produce mezcal.
The Union of Indigenous Communities of the Isthmus Region, a cooperative founded in 1982, assists in production and distribution of the local products, notably coffee, under a fair trade label.

References

Municipalities of Oaxaca